The 1908–09 Missouri Tigers men's basketball team represented the University of Missouri in the 1908–09 college basketball season. The team was led by first-year head coach Guy Lowman.  The captain of the team was Carl Ristine.

Missouri finished with a 10–5 record overall and a 4–5 record in the Missouri Valley Intercollegiate Athletic Association. This was good enough for tie for second place in the regular season conference standings.

Schedule and results

References

Missouri
Missouri Tigers men's basketball seasons
Missouri Tigers men's basketball
Missouri Tigers men's basketball